Lachvan (also Romanized as Lāchvān; also known as Lāhchwan and Pakhchvan) is a village in Howmeh Rural District, in the Central District of Khodabandeh County, Zanjan Province, Iran. At the 2006 census, its population was 1,712, in 411 families.

References 

Populated places in Khodabandeh County